Vladimir "Vlad" Caamaño (sometimes spelled Caamano, born August 12, 1979) is an American comedian and actor.

Career
Vladimir Caamaño was born in the Bronx to "a very traditional [Dominican American] family". His father was the superintendent to the building that he lived in. Much of Vlad's humor stems from his father and his personal life of which he tends to constantly mock in his stand up. He graduated Wesleyan University and began to perform stand-up full-time at comedy clubs most notably The Stand Comedy Club,  Gotham Comedy Club, Dangerfield's and Comic Strip Live. He signed with producers Adam Sztykiel and Bill Lawrence to create a pilot for a sitcom based around his personal life called A Bronx Life for NBC. The pilot was not picked up, but Vlad has expressed hope of it getting picked up by another network.

Vlad was named one of the ten funniest comedians to look for in 2016 by Variety. Howie Mandel chose Vlad as one of the "new faces" for his comedy gala. In 2019, he joined the cast of Tommy as series regular.

Personal life
Vlad works with the Psychological Trauma Center at Cedars-Sinai to help Hispanic children with learning disabilities.

Filmography

References

External links
 
 

Living people
American people of Dominican Republic descent
American male comedians
American male television actors
Entertainers from the Bronx
21st-century American comedians
21st-century American male actors
1979 births